This article provides basic feature comparison between some of the JavaScript-based source code editors available today.

Overview

List of features

Feature testing was performed with Firefox 3.0.6 against the current demo version, and results may not match those in other browsers or downloadable versions.

See also
 Comparison of online source code playgrounds
 HTML editor
 Online JavaScript IDE

References

 
Text editor comparisons
Text editors
Ajax (programming)
Object-oriented programming